Daniel Golubovic (born November 29, 1993) is an Australian decathlete. Golubovic won silver medal at 2022 Commonwealth Games.

Golubovic is a 2012 graduate of Mira Costa High School, 2016 alum of University of California, San Diego and 2017 MBA graduate of Fuqua School of Business at Duke University. In 2020, Golubovic was approved to represent Athletics Australia in international competition.

Golubovic's Team USA experiences were highlighted by 2018 U.S. Track & Field Championships, 4th (decathlon) & 2017 NCAA Division I Championships, 11th (decathlon). Golubovic placed 12th at 2014 NCAA Division II Men's Outdoor Track and Field Championships and won decathlon at 2014 California Collegiate Athletic Association championships. He won 2016 San Diego Aztecs decathlon with 7139 points (UCSD Tritons school record) and later placed All-American 6th at 2016 NCAA Division II Men's Outdoor Track and Field Championships with 7116 points.

NCAA career
Golubovic's National Collegiate Athletic Association championship experiences include 2017 NCAA Division I Championships, 11th (decathlon). Golubovic placed 12th at 2014 NCAA Division II Men's Outdoor Track and Field Championships and won decathlon at 2014 California Collegiate Athletic Association championships. He won 2016 San Diego Aztecs decathlon with 7139 points (UCSD Tritons school record) and later placed All-American 6th at 2016 NCAA Division II Men's Outdoor Track and Field Championships with 7116 points.

Competition record
Golubovic won silver medal at 2022 commonwealth games.

References

External links 
 
 Daniel Golubovic bio Duke University
 Daniel Golubovic bio University of California, San Diego
 Daniel Golubovic High School results
 Daniel Golubovic bio Team USA
 

1993 births
Living people
Australian male sprinters
Australian male hurdlers
Australian decathletes
University of California, San Diego alumni
Duke University alumni
Australian high jumpers
Australian pole vaulters
American pole vaulters
People from Torrance, California
Sportspeople from Manhattan Beach, California
Commonwealth Games silver medallists for Australia
Commonwealth Games medallists in athletics
Athletes (track and field) at the 2022 Commonwealth Games
Medallists at the 2022 Commonwealth Games